The Battle of Talavera (27–28 July 1809) saw an Imperial French army under King Joseph Bonaparte and Marshal Jean-Baptiste Jourdan attack a combined British and Spanish army led by Sir Arthur Wellesley. After several of their assaults were bloodily repulsed on the second day, the French retreated toward Madrid leaving the battlefield to the Anglo-Spanish army. Events soon compelled Wellesley, who was soon appointed Viscount Wellington, to fall back toward his base in Portugal. The following units and commanders fought at the battle, which occurred during the Peninsular War.

Anglo-Spanish Army
Commander-in-Chief of the Anglo-Spanish Army: Lieutenant General Sir Arthur Wellesley

British Army
Commander-in-Chief: Lieutenant General The Rt Hon Sir Arthur Wellesley KB

Total Anglo-Spanish forces: 52,735, 66 guns

Spanish Army
Commander-in-Chief: Lieutenant General Don Gregorio Garcia de la Cuesta y Fernández de Celis, Captain-General of Castilla

Spanish cavalry units ending in a number (Nr.) are regular units, and so is the Carabineros Reales Regiment. Other cavalry units are probably newly-raised volunteers. Regular units titled Cavalry are heavy cavalry, while units titled Cazadores are light cavalry. Units labeled Regiment are probably regular infantry from the old army, though Badajoz, Canarias, Mallorca, Osuna and Salamanca are not in Charles Oman's list. Units labeled Cazadores Regiment are regular light infantry. Infantry units titled Granaderos or Provincial are the standing militia units from the old army. All other infantry units are probably newly-raised volunteers.

French Army of the Centre
 Commander-in-Chief (nominal): Prince Joseph-Napoléon Bonaparte, King of Spain and of the Indies
 Chief-of-Staff (actual commander): Marshal of France Jean-Baptiste Jourdan, Major-General of the Armies of the King of Spain

Total French forces: 46,180, 84 guns

I Corps d'Armée
Marshal of France Claude Perrin Victor, Duke of Belluno

IV Corps d'Armée
General of Division Horace-Francois-Bastien Sebastiani de La Porta

Reserves
King Joseph Bonaparte

Notes

References

Peninsular War orders of battle